DOMINE is a database of known and predicted protein domain interactions (or domain-domain interactions). It contains interactions observed in PDB crystal structures, and those predicted by several computational approaches. DOMINE uses Pfam HMM profiles for protein domain definitions. The DOMINE database contains 26,219 interactions among 5,410 domains), which includes 6,634 known interactions inferred from PDB structure data.

References

See also 
 DOMINE database

Biological databases
Protein structure
Protein domains